L'Étudiante is the second novel by Vanessa Duriès.

Like Le lien, Vanessa Duriès's first novel, this is an autobiographical story. It has not been completed, since Vanessa Duriès was killed in a car accident when it was being written.

This second novel puts in parallel her very special kind of sexuality and her life as a student in Bordeaux. As in Le lien, she is very clear and blunt when she describes her BDSM scenes, but she also describes her interest for the quieter love lives of her fellow students, love lives which she pokes fun at but that nevertheless exert some fascination on her, leading her to a clear analysis of the SM milieu.

Although it was written in 1993, it was only published in 2007 in the form of a joint volume with Le Lien by the Éditions Blanche.

The cover image of the book is taken from Vanessa Duriès's pictorial for the French edition of Penthouse.

Further reading
 Le lien (in French) – Editions J'ai lu –  
 The Ties that Bind (translated from the French) – Masquerade Books – 

1993 novels
BDSM literature
French erotic novels
French autobiographical novels
Unfinished novels